Enonkoski is a municipality of Finland. It is encircled by the city of Savonlinna in the Southern Savonia region. It is the smallest municipality in Southern Savonia in terms of population.

History
Enonkoski was founded in 1882. Before that it was part of Kerimäki and Heinävesi. The major reason for the foundation of independent parish of Enonkoski happened in 1858. Enonkoski did not have its own church, and on Sundays people had to row to the church to Kerimäki, a parish Enonkoski was part of that time. In 1858 there was a church boat accident in the lake Ylä-Enonvesi, which led to the death of eight people. After that, a Russian businessman and a leader of an Enonkoski glass factory and a sawmill decided to build a church in Enonkoski. He is alleged to have said: "the people in Enonkoski do not anymore have to drown on their trips to the church". The wooden church was built in the next year but it was destroyed in a fire caused by lightning in 1884. A new church made of wood, which is still in use, was built in 1886.

Languages
The municipality is unilingually Finnish.

There also is a Russian speaking minority.

Religion
The majority of the people living in Enonkoski are Evangelical Lutheran. There is a church in the centre of Enonkoski, built in 1886.  The only Evangelical Lutheran monastery in Finland, the Monastic Protestant Community in Enonkoski, is located in Enonkoski.

Transport
It also has other roads which lead to the small dock neighborhood called Hyypiänniemi and to another area known as Hanhivirta.

Amenities

Enonkoski is a very small town, with two small supermarkets, a gas station, a gift shop, several bakeries and cafés and a bar. It also has a retirement home called Iltasatu, which translates to bedtime story.

Towards the edge of the town, near a fire station, there is a running track with a well-kept field (usually used for association football) in the middle. In addition, there is a school which has an ice skating rink, used in the winter, and an indoor sports arena. Adjacent to the school is a library built in 1992. Enonkoski houses a rehab facility.

Industry
The largest business in the town is a fish research plant where they raise fish in a controlled environment and then release them into the lakes which are abundant in the area.

Sport
Enonkoski has a juniors and senior volleyball team Enonkosken Pyrintö playing in the second highest tier of men's volleyball in Finland. Football club Karvilan Kivekkäät has a couple of youth teams and a women's team that won the regional championship in 2009. There is also a cross country track used for cross-country skiing in winter and jogging in summer. Participation in the yearly skiing competitions is very high. Orienteering is also quite popular sport. The sports club for athletics, skiing and orienteering is called Enonkosken Urheilijat.

Notable people
 Antti Loikkanen (1955) is a Finnish former middle-distance and endurance runner (European indoor champion 1978)

Villages
Hanhijärvi, Ihamaniemi, Joutsenmäki, Karvila, Laasala, Makkola, Muhola, Paakkunala, Parkumäki, Simanala, Suurimäki and Vuorikoski are villages in Enonkoski.

Border changes
In 2009 the neighbouring municipalities of Enonkoski, Savonranta and the city of Savonlinna, unified as a one municipality. According to the law of Finland, the unifying municipalities must have a land connection between them, which Savoninna and Savonranta did not have. After Kerimäki and Punkaharju were consolidated with the town of Savonlinna on 1 January 2013, Enonkoski became completely surrounded by the emerging city.

References

External links

Municipality of Enonkoski – Official website

 
Populated places established in 1882